Ahkinoah Habah Izarh, better known by the stage name AHI is a Canadian singer-songwriter. He has been a two-time Juno Award nominee for Contemporary Roots Album of the Year, receiving nods at the Juno Awards of 2019 for his album In Our Time and at the Juno Awards of 2022 for his album Prospect.

Originally from Brampton, Ontario and based primarily in Toronto, he released his debut album We Made It Through the Wreckage in 2016. In 2017, he won the Canadian Songwriting Competition in the folk category, as well as the Stingray Rising Star Award at the Folk Music Ontario conference. He then signed to Thirty Tigers, which released his sophomore album In Our Time in 2018.

Discography
2016: We Made It Through the Wreckage
2018: In Our Time
2021: Prospect

References

External links

Canadian folk singer-songwriters
Canadian male singer-songwriters
Musicians from Brampton
Living people
21st-century Black Canadian male singers
Year of birth missing (living people)